Southwark London Borough Council is the local authority for the London Borough of Southwark in London, England. The council is elected every four years. Since the last boundary changes in 2018, 63 councillors have been elected from 23 wards.

Political control
The first election to the council was held in 1964, initially operating as a shadow authority before the new system came into full effect in 1965. Political control of the council since 1964 has been held by the following parties:

Leadership
The leaders of the council since 1965 have been:

Council elections
 1964 Southwark London Borough Council election
 1968 Southwark London Borough Council election (boundary changes took place but the number of seats remained the same)
 1971 Southwark London Borough Council election (boundary changes took place but the number of seats remained the same)
 1974 Southwark London Borough Council election
 1978 Southwark London Borough Council election (boundary changes increased the number of seats by four)
 1982 Southwark London Borough Council election
 1986 Southwark London Borough Council election
 1990 Southwark London Borough Council election
 1994 Southwark London Borough Council election (boundary changes took place but the number of seats remained the same)
 1998 Southwark London Borough Council election
 2002 Southwark London Borough Council election (boundary changes reduced the number of seats by one)
 2006 Southwark London Borough Council election
 2010 Southwark London Borough Council election
 2014 Southwark London Borough Council election
 2018 Southwark London Borough Council election (boundary changes took place but the number of seats remained the same)
 2022 Southwark London Borough Council election

Borough result maps

By-election results

1964-1968
There were no by-elections.

1968-1971

1971-1974
There were no by-elections.

1974-1978

1978-1982

The by-election was called following the death of Cllr. Siah Cox

The by-election was called following the death of Cllr. Peter Flower

The by-election was called following the death of Cllr. Enid Boxall

The by-election was called following the resignation of Cllr. Frank Brean

1982-1986

The by-election was called following the resignation of Cllr. James Patrick

The by-election was called following the resignation of Cllr. Robert Smyth

The by-election was called following the resignation of Cllr. Ronald Slater

The by-election was called following the resignation of Cllr. John Meakin

The by-election was called following the resignation of Cllr. Paula Moore

The by-election was called following the resignation of Cllr. Harold Young

The by-election was called following the resignation of Cllr. Barbara Burgess

The by-election was called following the resignation of Cllr. John Fowler

1986-1990

The by-election was called following the resignation of Cllr. George Walker

The by-election was called following the resignation of Cllr. Ali Balli

The by-election was called following the resignation of Cllr. Elsie Headley

The by-election was called following the resignation of Cllr. Linda Oram

The by-election was called following the resignation of Cllr. Joan Price

The by-election was called following the resignation of Cllr. Kenneth Carlisle

The by-election was called following the resignation of Cllr. Alan Crane

The by-election was called following the resignation of Cllr. David Main

1990-1994

The by-election was called following the death of Cllr. John E. Maurice.

1994-1998

The by-election was called following the resignation of Cllr. James R. Munday.

The by-election was called following the resignation of Cllr. Mike Lee.

The by-election was called following the resignation of Cllr. Elizabeth Denton.

The by-election was called following the resignation of Cllr. Sonya J. H. Murison.

The by-election was called following the resignation of Cllr. Svetlana Kirov.

The by-election was called following the resignation of Cllr. Robert A. Bayne.

The by-election was called following the resignation of Cllr. Paul Cheesman.

The by-election was called following the resignation of Cllr. Eyscene Sheilds.

1998-2002

The by-election was called following the resignation of Cllr. Nicola A. Kutapan.

The by-election was called following the death of Cllr. Victor D. Jones.

The by-election was called following the resignation of Cllr. Clifford J. Hodson.

2002-2006

The by-election was called following the death of Cllr. Margaret Ambrose.

2006-2010

The by-election was called following the resignation of Cllr. Paul D. L. Baichoo.

The by-election was called following the death of Cllr. Anne Yates.

2010-2014

The by-election was called following the resignation of Cllr. John J. Friary.

The by-election was called following the resignation of Cllr. Ms. Keadean M. Rhoden.

The by-election was called following the death of Cllr. Tayo A. Situ.

The by-election was called following the death of Cllr. Ms. Helen Morrissey.

2014-2018

The by-election was called following the resignation of Councillor Claire Maugham.

The by-election was called following the resignation of Councillor Helen Hayes, the Member of Parliament for Dulwich and West Norwood.

The by election was called following the resignation of Councillor Neil Coyle, the Member of Parliament for Bermondsey and Old Southwark.

The by-election was called following the resignation of Councillor Lisa Rajan.

References

 By-election results

External links
 Southwark Council